Chantal Thomas (born 18 October 1945, in Lyon) is a French writer and historian. Her 2002 book, Farewell, My Queen, won the Prix Femina and was adapted into a 2012 film starring Diane Kruger and Léa Seydoux.

Career
Thomas was born in Lyon in 1945, and was raised in Arcachon, Bordeaux, and Paris. Her life has included teaching jobs at American and French universities (such as Yale and Princeton) as well as a publishing career. She has published nineteen works, including essays on the Marquis de Sade, Casanova, and Marie Antoinette.

In 2002, Thomas published Les adieux à la reine (Farewell, My Queen). The novel gave a fictional account of the final days of Marie Antoinette in power through the perspective of one of her servants. It won the Prix Femina in 2002, and was later adapted into the 2012 film Farewell, My Queen. The film stars Diane Kruger as the titular queen and Léa Seydoux as her servant Sidonie Laborde. Thomas co-wrote the screenplay, and it opened the 62nd Berlin International Film Festival. Helen Falconer of The Guardian called the work "a well written slice of history" with "evocative, observant prose," but criticized it for creating a narrator who "merely provides us with a pair of eyes to see through rather than capturing our interest in her own right." While disagreeing in its classification as a novel, Falconer did however add that Farewell, My Queen "generates in the reader a real sense of being a fly on the wall, eavesdropping on the affairs of the great and the not so good."

Thomas is currently the director of research at the French National Centre for Scientific Research.

She was elected a member of the Académie française (seat number 12) on 28 January 2021.

Works
 Sade, L'œil de la lettre (1978)
 Casanova, Un voyage libertin (1985)
 Don Juan ou Pavlov, Essai sur la communication publicitaire (1991)
 La Reine scélérate, Marie-Antoinette dans les pamphlets (1989)
translated into English as The Wicked Queen : The Origins of the Myth of Marie-Antoinette (1999) by Julie Rose
 Thomas Bernhard (1990)
 Sade (1994)
 La Vie réelle des petites filles (1995)
 Comment supporter sa liberté (1998)
translated into English as Coping with freedom : reflections on ephemeral happiness (2001), by Andrea L. Secara
 Les Adieux à la Reine (2002)
translated into English as Farewell, My Queen (2003), by Moishe Black 
 La Lectrice-Adjointe (2003)
 Souffrir (2003)
 L'île flottante (2004)
 Apolline ou L'école de la Providence (2005)
 Le Palais de la reine (2005)
 Chemins de sable, Conversation avec Claude Plettner (2006)
 Jardinière Arlequin, Conversations avec Alain Passard (2006)
 Cafés de la mémoire (2008)
 Le Testament d'Olympe (2010)
 L'esprit de conversation (2011)
 L'Échange des princesses (2013)
translated into English as The Exchange of Princesses (2014), by John Cullen
 Un air de liberté. Variations sur l'esprit du XVIIIe siècle (2014)
 Souvenirs de la marée basse (2017)
translated into English as Memories of Low Tide (2019), by Natasha Lehrer
 East Village Blues (2019)
 Café Vivre. chroniques en passant (2020)
 Journal de nage (2022)

References

External links

Writers from Lyon
1945 births
Living people
French women novelists
Prix Femina winners
French historical novelists
Members of the Académie Française
Prix Roger Caillois recipients
French essayists